Kevin McGoldrick (born 12 May 1972) is a Scottish retired football manager and coach, who is currently manager of Kirkintilloch Rob Roy. As a player, he made over 110 appearances as a left winger in the Scottish League for Queen's Park and also played for East Stirlingshire and Morton. He was capped by Scotland at U16 level and was a part of the squad which reached the final of the 1989 U16 World Championship.

After his retirement as a player, McGoldrick entered coaching and held youth roles with Queen's Park, Stenhousemuir, the Scottish Football Association and in China on behalf of Manchester City. He was assistant manager at Stenhousemuir in two spells and took joint-caretaker charge of the team in 2010. He also served East Fife as assistant manager. McGoldrick later managed Kilsyth Rangers and Kirkintilloch Rob Roy.

Personal life 
McGoldrick is the uncle of footballer Salim Kouider-Aissa. He has worked as a taxi driver and in a tannery.

Honours 
Queen's Park
 Scottish League Third Division: 1999–00
Harestanes
 Scottish Amateur Cup: 2001–02, 2002–03

References

External links 

 
 

Scottish footballers
Scottish Football League players
Queen's Park F.C. players
Association football midfielders
1972 births
Footballers from Glasgow
Greenock Morton F.C. players
East Stirlingshire F.C. players
Scotland youth international footballers
Harestanes A.F.C. players
Stenhousemuir F.C. managers
Scottish Football League managers
Queen's Park F.C. non-playing staff
Manchester City F.C. non-playing staff
British taxi drivers
Living people
Scottish football managers
Kirkintilloch Rob Roy F.C. managers